The Caretaker Prime Minister of Pakistan is the acting head of government in Pakistan following the dissolution of the National Assembly. The purpose of this post is to ensure free and fair elections are held. The most recent Caretaker PM was former Chief Justice Nasirul Mulk, who took office on 31 May 2018, after the National Assembly dissolved, then resigned the office when Imran Khan was sworn in on 18 August 2018.

Federal law and constitution
Following the dissolution of the National Assembly, whether it is dissolved by the completion of its term or by an early dissolution, the President shall appoint a Caretaker government. However, this must be done with the consultation of the Prime Minister and the Leader of the Opposition, who should reach a consensus on whom to choose as Caretaker PM. If this consensus is not reached, the President is free to choose a Caretaker Prime Minister of his choice, although this is usually done in consultation with the Election Commission of Pakistan.

List of caretaker prime ministers of Pakistan

See also
Acting President of Pakistan

References

External links
 Profile on the website of the government of Pakistan

Politics of Pakistan
 
Parliament of Pakistan
Continuity of government in Pakistan
Caretaker governments